was an autobahn spur in Göttingen. It has now been downgraded and made part of the Bundesstraße 27, as the A 38 has recently been finished. The A 388 was supposed to be the first part of the A 38, branching off the A 7 in the North of Göttingen, however plans were carried out differently and the A 38 now meets with the A 7 near Friedland.

Exit list 

|-

|}

External links 

388
A388